Nozdrachevo is a rural locality and the administrative center of Nozdrachevsky Selsoviet Rural Settlement, Kursky District, Kursk Oblast, Russia. Population:

Geography 
The village is located on the Vinogrobl River (a left tributary of the Tuskar in the basin of the Seym), 107 km from the Russia–Ukraine border, 9 km north-east of the district center – the town Kursk.

 Climate
Nozdrachevo has a warm-summer humid continental climate (Dfb in the Köppen climate classification).

Transport 

The rural locality is situated 9 km from Kursk Vostochny Airport, 131 km from Belgorod International Airport and 198 km from Voronezh Peter the Great Airport.

References

Notes

Sources

Rural localities in Kursky District, Kursk Oblast